The 2004 Qamishli riots were an uprising by Syrian Kurds in the northeastern city of Qamishli in March 2004. The riots started during a chaotic football match, when some Arab fans of the guest team started raising pictures of Saddam Hussein, an action that angered the Kurdish fans of the host team, because of Hussein's Anfal campaign against Iraqi Kurds. Both groups began throwing stones at each other. The Ba'ath Party local office was burned down by Kurdish demonstrators, leading to the security forces reacting. The Syrian army responded quickly, deploying troops backed by tanks and helicopters, and launching a crack-down.  Events climaxed when Kurds in Qamishli toppled a statue of Hafez al-Assad. At least 30 Kurds were killed as the security services re-asserted control over the city. As a result of the crackdown, thousands of Syrian Kurds fled to Iraqi Kurdistan.

Background

Qamishli is the largest town in Al-Hasakah Governorate and is located in northeast Syria. It is regarded as the Kurdish and Assyrian community capital. It is also the center of the Syrian Kurdish struggle, especially in the recent years.

The Kurds also felt opposition from the Syrian government in 1962, forty years before, when the government took census and left out of it many Kurds. This left them and their children without citizenship and the right to obtain government jobs or to have property. This disregarded minority now consists of hundreds of thousands of Kurds, who carry identification cards as "foreigner". Another move the government made which has fueled tensions was resettling Arabs from other parts of the country into along the border in Iran, Iraq and Turkey. They did this in order to build a buffer between Kurdish areas, which has furthered the hatred between the Kurds and Arabs.

The United States has for a longer period of time recognized Iraqi Kurdistan diplomatically which has led the Americans to invite the current Kurdish leader of Iraqi Kurdistan, Masoud Barzani, to the White House and a meeting in Baghdad when the American president was in town. The visit from United States Vice President, Joe Biden, to the fourth largest city in Iraq, Erbil, also known as the Iraqi Kurdistan capital, helped strengthen their alliance with them. The United States started Operation Provide Comfort and Operation Provide Comfort II in an attempt to defend Kurds fleeing their homes in Northern Iraq as a result of the Iraqi Gulf War. Kurdish representation in Iraqi government has increased since the American invasion in 2003. Jalal Talabani, the first Kurdish president of Iraq, was elected in 2005, and Kurds have held the presidential seat since, although the position is somewhat ornamental.

2004 events
On 12 March 2004, a football match in Qamishli between a local Kurdish team and an Arab team from Deir ez-Zor in Syria's southeast sparked violent clashes between fans of the opposing sides which spilled into the streets of the city. The fans of the Arab team reportedly rode about town in a bus, insulting the Iraqi Kurdish leaders Masoud Barzani and Jalal Talabani, then leaders of Iraqi Kurdistan's two main parties, and brandishing portraits of deposed Iraqi leader Saddam Hussein, whose infamous Al-Anfal Campaign killed an estimated 182,000 Kurdish civilians in Iraq. In response, Kurdish fans supposedly proclaimed "We will sacrifice our lives for Bush", referring to US President George W. Bush, who invaded Iraq in 2003, deposing Saddam and triggering the Iraq War. Tensions between the groups came to a head, and the Deir ez-Zor Arab fans attacked the Kurdish fans with sticks, stones, and knives. Government security forces brought in to quell the riot, fired into the crowd, killing six people, including three children—all of them were Kurds.

The Ba'ath Party local office was burned down by the demonstrators, leading to the security forces responding and killing more than 15 of the rioters and wounding more than 100. Officials in Qamishli alleged that some Kurdish parties were collaborating with "foreign forces" to supposedly annex some villages in the area to northern Iraq. Events climaxed when Kurds in Qamishli toppled a statue of Hafez al-Assad. The Syrian army responded quickly, deploying thousands of troops backed by tanks and helicopters. At least 30 Kurds were killed as the security services re-took the city, over 2,000 were arrested at that time or subsequently.

Prosecution of the Kurdish protestors 
After the violence, President Bashar al-Assad visited the region aiming to achieve a "national unity" and supposedly pardoned 312 Kurds who were prosecuted of participating in the massacre.

Aftermath

Moqebleh (Moquoble) refugee camp

After the 2004 events in Qamishli, thousands of Kurds fled to the Kurdish Region of Iraq. Local authorities there, the UNHCR and other UN agencies established the Moqebleh camp at a former Army base near Dohuk.

Several years later the KRG moved all refugees, who arrived before 2005, to housing in a second camp, known as Qamishli. The camp consists of a modest housing development with dozens of concrete block houses and a mosque.

The original camp at the former Army citadel now contains about 300 people. Many of the homes are made of cement blocks, covered with plastic tarpaulins. Latrines and showers are in separate buildings down the street. Authorities provide electricity, water trucks and food rations.

Syrian Kurds can leave the camp to work. As supposed refugees they cannot get government jobs, but are able work in the private sector, often as construction workers or drivers. The Syrian Kurds seem likely not to return to Syria until political conditions change.

2005 demonstrations
In June 2005, thousands of Kurds demonstrated in Qamishli to protest the assassination of Sheikh Khaznawi, a Kurdish cleric in Syria, resulting in the death of one policeman and injury to four Kurds. In March 2008, according to Human Rights Watch, Syrian security forces opened fire at Kurds who were celebrating the spring festival of Nowruz. The shooting killed three people.

2008 vigil in memory of the riots 
On 21 March 2008, the Kurdish New Year (Newroz) a school class held a 5 minute vigil in memory of the  2004 Qamishli riots. The participants were investigated for holding the vigil.

2011 protests in Qamishli

With the eruption of the Syrian Civil War, the city of Qamishli became one of the protest arenas. On 12 March 2011, thousands of Syrian Kurds in Qamishli and al-Hasakah protested on the day of the Kurdish martyr, an annual event since 2004 al-Qamishli protests.

2012 rebellion

In 2012, armed elements among the Kurds launched Syrian Kurdish rebellion in north and north-western Syria, aiming against Syrian government forces. In the second half of 2012, the rebellion also resulted in clashes between Kurdish soldiers and the militants of the Free Syrian Army, both striving towards control of the region. The AANES would later gain control over most of northern Syria.

See also
Assyrians in Syria
First Iraqi–Kurdish War
Human rights in Syria
Kurdish–Turkish conflict
Kurds in Syria
List of modern conflicts in the Middle East
Serhildan

References

Further reading 

Qamishli
Riots and civil disorder in Syria
History of the Autonomous Administration of North and East Syria
2004 in Syria
2004 riots
Association football hooliganism
Persecution of Kurds in Syria
Kurdish rebellions in Syria
Kurdish protests
March 2004 events in Asia
Democratic Union Party (Syria)
2004 crimes in Syria